Alexandra Shungudzo Govere, better known as Shungudzo, is a Zimbabwean-American singer and reality television personality. She first attracted media attention by being the first black female gymnast to represent Zimbabwe in artistic gymnastics at the 1999 All-Africa Games, and later by co-founding the Kijana Project, which provides relief for AIDS orphans. She later gained wide media attention as a cast member on the 2011 season of The Real World: San Diego.

Early life 
Alexandra Govere was born in the United States and grew up in Zimbabwe, in a rural village that was home to straw-covered mud huts, and did not have electricity or running water. She is of Zimbabwean, French, and Amerindian descent. Her family eventually relocated to California, and as of the early 2000s, she was living in Oregon.

Career

Ballet, gymnastics and education 
Govere practiced dancing and ballet, and according to her, became the first female of color to be on the Zimbabwe National Gymnastics Team at age 9. Her parents, both of whom are college graduates, encouraged her in her studies as well. She studied calculus at age 10, and finished high school by 14. She later attended Stanford University, where she studied civil engineering.

Govere was the first black female artistic gymnast to represent Zimbabwe at the 1999 All-Africa Games in Johannesburg. She was also the youngest member of the 162-member team.

Charity work 
In 1997, Govere began collecting clothing for orphans who lost their parents to AIDS. By 2002, the Kijana Project, as it came to be called, had expanded to an international organization run by then-15-year-old Govere and her sister Saunsuray, consisting of 50 members who aided orphans in six different countries, raising money for clothing, toys and school supplies, as well as paying for the education of some AIDS orphans. Govere was spurred to this work after witnessing many of her childhood classmates affected by AIDS, and seeing the rising number of orphans living on the streets of Harare. In 2000, she worked with her sister in collecting money for Red Cross flood relief in Mozambique. For breaking the color barrier in artistic gymnastics, and for her humanitarian work, Govere was designated a Disney-UNESCO Millennium Dreamers Ambassador.

Music and television 

While attending Stanford University, Govere was discovered by Alicia Keys' Grammy Award-winning producer, Kerry "Krucial" Brothers, who had heard some songs Govere placed on MySpace for her mother to hear. Although she initially met with Brothers with the intent to be a songwriter, he made her sing vocals, and recognized her talent. With him, she released a mixtape, "Love is 4 Suckaz/I'm a Sucka 4 Love", some songs from which are available on YouTube. Brass magazine describes the mixtape as "a high-wattage soup of synthetic beats and heavy post-production mixing", whose lyrics focus on the themes of love, jealousy, revenge and anti-consumerism. Describing Govere's voice, Brandon Goldner of Brass says, "[Her voice] can range from bright and flute-like to a rougher, almost smoky honesty" Although Govere planned to debut a 2011 album with Krucial, She announced in October 2011 that she left Krucial to take the independent route. She has co-written a number of hit songs such as Little Mix's "Touch" and Louisa Johnson's "Best Behaviour", and has released a song on the Fifty Shades Freed soundtrack. In 2018, she released her latest single, "Paper".

Govere was a cast member on MTV's The Real World: San Diego, which aired in 2011. Govere was also a writer, host, and correspondent for both MTV Act and MTV Voices.

I'm not a mother, but I have children 
Shungudzo released "It's a good day (to fight the system)", the first single from her debut album by Svikiro Records/Young Forever/BMG on October 30, 2020, as part of her three-track manifesto "I (motsi)". According to American Songwriter, "good day" is "a bold genre-defying anthem that balances passionate proclamations with sunny guitar and horn arrangements and stacked harmonies." Shungudzo followed up "good day" with the singles "To be me", which premiered on Paper video on February 2, 2021;) "There's only so much a soul can take" (song premiere on Zane Lowe's Apple Music 1 radio show and video premiere on FLOOD), "White parents" (premiere on Consequence of Sound on April 14, 2021), and the title track "I'm not a mother, but I have children." For "it's a good day" and "There's only so much a soul can take", Shungudzo was recognized as an "emerging artist to watch for in 2021" by People. Hailed by Zane Lowe as "completely unique and individual" and as an artist to "match up with asap" by Essence, "Shungudzo isn't putting up with the bullshit anymore" (Refinery29).

Shungudzo performed "There's only so much a soul can take" on the June 9, 2021, episode of Full Frontal with Samantha Bee.

Personal life 
As of 2011, Govere was living in Los Angeles with her boyfriend, Byron, whom she began seeing eight months prior to filming The Real World. Their relationship was depicted in episode 4 of that season when he visited her at the season residence.

Discography

Albums

Singles

As lead artist

As featured artist

Guest appearances

Songwriting credits

References

External links 

Living people
Sportspeople from Masvingo Province
HIV/AIDS activists
Zimbabwean female artistic gymnasts
The Real World (TV series) cast members
21st-century American women singers
21st-century American singers
American women songwriters
American dance musicians
American electronic musicians
21st-century Zimbabwean women singers
American people of Zimbabwean descent
American women in electronic music
Competitors at the 1999 All-Africa Games
African Games competitors for Zimbabwe
1990 births